Raquel Salas Rivera (born December 26, 1985) is a bilingual Puerto Rican poet who writes in Spanish and English, focusing on the experience of being a migrant to the United States, the colonial status of Puerto Rico, and of identifying as a queer Puerto Rican and Philadelphian of non-binary gender. He has a Ph.D. in Comparative Literature and Literary Theory from the University of Pennsylvania  and was selected as the fourth Poet Laureate of Philadelphia in 2018. He currently lives in Puerto Rico.

Education and early life

Raquel Salas Rivera was born in Mayagüez, Puerto Rico and moved to Madison, Wisconsin when he was 6 months old. During his childhood years, he lived in California, Nebraska, Alabama, and Texas. He returned to Puerto Rico during his teenage years and young adulthood, moving to Philadelphia for graduate studies. His grandfather, Sotero Rivera Avilés, was a Puerto Rican poet belonging to the Guajana Generation, as is his mother, linguist Yolanda Rivera Castillo.

The poet attended the Universidad de Puerto Rico at Mayagüez for his undergraduate degree, and had an instrumental role in organizing student protests at that campus in 2010.

Career and writing

Salas Rivera's writing emphasizes movement and often deals with themes of migration. In speaking about his heritage, the author acknowledges that migrating people have multiple homes and allegiances, and states that "My home is Philadelphia, and my home is Puerto Rico.”

He prefers to write in Spanish, and later sometimes translates his works to English. For public readings, he often recites works only in Spanish. According to the poet, "It's a political act" to have an audience of non-Spanish speakers listen to a language they don't understand, because the momentary discomfort echoes the everyday struggles of immigrants who don't yet understand the language of their new country. In his writing, he often leaves some words untranslated, which he refers to as "knots" that "resist assimilation and loss" because language and experience can be so tightly bound as to defy separation.

His work lo terciario/the tertiary focuses on the Puerto Rican debt crisis and the economic and social impact of the 2016 United States congressional measure called the PROMESA Law that transferred control of the island's finances and outstanding debt to an external control board. Salas Rivera titled each book section after Marxist economic ideas from Das Kapital: “The Debt-Production Process,” “The Debt-Circulation Process,” and “Notes on a Derailed Circulation", beginning each poem with a quote by Karl Marx, as both a critique and a subversion of Marxist language.

The poet identifies as non-binary gender and refers to himself with the pronoun "he". He has adopted the Spanish word "buchipluma",  in as a neologism for a "non-binary feathered butch" to describe his gender identity. One of his inspirations is the Puerto Rican Latin trap singer Bad Bunny. To Salas Rivera, poetry has given him "an inside", "an outside", and "a means for talking about things", referencing gender identity. Acknowledging a historical lack of transgender persons' voices in literature, Salas Rivera has attempted to "navigate" this gap by speaking from a transgender perspective. Through his writing and civic activism, he seeks to "engage people throughout Philadelphia neighborhoods" and "make a Philadelphia that is safe for difference".

During his tenure as Poet Laureate of Philadelphia, Salas Rivera created a multilingual poetry festival called "We (Too) Are Philly" inspired by the work "I, Too" by the African-American poet Langston Hughes. The summer 2018 festival, co-organized with poets Ashley Davis, Kirwyn Sutherland, and Raena Shirali, featured Philadelphia-based poets of color. The goal of the organizers was to diversify the poetry scene to encourage the mixing or desegregation of audiences, while selecting locations of significance to particular Philadelphia neighborhoods that usually do not host poetry readings.

Personal life

Salas Rivera lives in San Juan, Puerto Rico. In 2017, Salas Rivera and Allison Harris raised thousands of dollars to assist lesbian, gay, bisexual, and transgender Puerto Ricans who were impacted by Hurricane Maria that year. Through his efforts, he was able to bring 5 queer/transgender persons to the United States and support them, with assistance from the Mazzoni Center. That same year, Salas Rivera, alongside Ricardo Alberto Maldonado, Erica Mena, and Carina del Valle Schorske, published Puerto Rico en mi corazón, a series of bilingual broadside of contemporary Puerto Rican poets. All profits from the sale of the broadsides were donated to the grassroots organization Taller Salud, in order to aid with recovery after the devastation caused by the impact of hurricanes Irma and María.

Works

Books of poetry
2022: antes que isla es volcán / before island is volcano. Beacon Press, OCLC 1277183477
2020: x/ex/exis. Bilingual Press/Editorial Bilingüe.
2019: Puerto Rico en mi corazón, ed. Salas Rivera, Maldonado, Mena, Del Valle Schorske, Anomalous Press.
2019: while they sleep (under the bed is another country). Birds, LLC.
2018: lo terciario/the tertiary,  OCLC 1055273795
2017: tierra intermitente/intermittent land. Ediciones Alayubia, 1st ed.
2017: Desdominios. Douda Correria. (Portuguese translation) OCLC 1076641364
2016: oropel/tinsel.  OCLC 1021770124
2011: Caneca de anhelos turbios,  OCLC 764494213

Artist books
 Gringo Death Coloring Book, with art by Erica Mena and Mariana Ramos Ortiz

Editorial works
 #27 :: Indigenous Futures and Imagining the Decolonial, co-edited with BBP Hosmillo and Sarah Clark, Anomalous Press.
 Puerto Rico en Mi Corazón, co-edited with Erica Mena, Ricardo Alberto Maldonado, and Carina del Valle Schorske, Anomalous Press.
 The Wanderer, co-editor, 2016-2018.

Contributor to anthologies
2018: Small blows against encroaching totalitarianism.,  OCLC 1049785850

Salas Rivera has also published in periodicals such as the Revista del Instituto de Cultura Puertorriqueña, Apiary, Apogee, BOAAT, and the Boston Review.

Awards and honors

He was a resident artist of the 2018-2019 Kimmel Center Jazz Residency, a 2019 Playwright Fellow at the Sundance Institute Theater Program, a 2020 writer in residence for the Norwegian Festival of Literature, and a 2020 resident artist of the MacDowell Colony.

Salas Rivera was a 2018 fellow of the CantoMundo Poetry Workshop to develop Latinx poets and poetry.

Salas Rivera was chosen as the fourth poet laureate of Philadelphia in 2018, under the auspices of the Free Library of Philadelphia. According to the selection committee, the poet was chosen because of his desire to use poetry to engage the subject of diversity in Philadelphia and its Puerto Rican community.

He received the 2018 Ambroggio Prize from the Academy of American Poets, honoring poets whose first language is Spanish, for his manuscript x/ex/exis (poemas para la nación).

His work lo terciario/the tertiary was longlisted for the National Book Award for Poetry in 2018  and won the 2018 Lambda Literary Award for Transgender Poetry.

In 2019, he won the Laureate Fellowship from the Academy of American Poets.

His work while they sleep (under the bed is another country) was longlisted for the 2020 Pen America Open Book Award.

He is a 2019-2021 Writer for the Art for Justice Fund at the University of Arizona Poetry Center.

See also

List of Puerto Rican writers
Puerto Rican literature

References

External links

 
A Note on Translation (Waxwings Magazine)

Interviews 

Philadelphia’s 2018-2019 Poet Laureate Helps Puerto Rico’s LGBTQ+ Community, April 23, 2018, Philadelphia Neighborhoods 3
Streets Dept. Podcast #9 - Interview with Raquel Salas Rivera
Free Library of Philadelphia - Introducing Philadelphia's 2018-2019 Poet Laureate Raquel Salas Rivera
Navigating Distance: A Conversation on Contemporary Puerto Rican Poetry, November 29, 2018, Kelly Writers House

Performances 

Poets House 2018: Showcase Reading Series: Denizé Lauture, Katy Lederer, Raquel Salas Rivera, Chen Chen, August 2, 2018, Poets House
AAWWTV: Translation/Migration Mixtape with Raquel Salas Rivera, Janice Lobo Sapigao, Adeeba Talukder, April 23, 2018, Asian American Writers' Workshop
Presentación de oropel/tinsel en Libros AC, February 23, 2017, Raquel Salas Rivera

Puerto Rican LGBT poets
21st-century American poets
Puerto Rican poets
Writers from Philadelphia
Living people
1986 births
People from Mayagüez, Puerto Rico
University of Puerto Rico alumni
University of Puerto Rico at Mayagüez people
Poets Laureate of Philadelphia
Municipal Poets Laureate in the United States
American translators
Lambda Literary Award winners
Non-binary poets
American non-binary writers
Puerto Rican non-binary people